The  were a group of eight Bakumatsu period coastal artillery batteries erected by Tottori Domain on the Sea of Japan coast in what is now Tottori Prefecture in the San'in region of northern Japan. The ruins of six of the eight sites remain; four of which were collectively designated a National Historic Site in 1988 with the additional sites added to the designation in 2016.

Background
In the late Edo period, the Tokugawa shogunate was increasing alarmed by incursions by foreign ships into Japanese territorial waters, fearing that these  kurofune warships of the United States or other Western powers would attempt to end Japan's self-imposed national isolation policy by force, or would attempt an invasion of Japan by landing hostile military forces. Numerous feudal domains were ordered to establish fortifications along their coastlines with shore artillery located at strategic locations. The daimyō of Tottori Domain, Ikeda Yoshinori was the fifth son of Tokugawa Nariaki of Mito Domain and at the time was a hard-line supporter of the sonnō jōi movement as promoted by the Mitogaku school of politics and also an advocate of military modernization along western lines.

Yura Daiba ruins
The  are located in the Yura neighborhood of the town of Hokuei. This was the first coastal gun battery built by Tottori Domain and is influenced by French military design. Completed in 1864, it has a trapezoidal shape measuring about 125 meters from east-to-west and about 83 meters from north-to-south. The remains of an earthen mound with a height of about 5 meters are almost completely preserved. The site held one 60-inch, 24-inch, 15-inch, and 5-inch guns which had been manufactured by Tottori Domain at the Mutsuo reverberatory furnace. The site is about a 20-minute walk from Yura Station on the JR West San'in Main Line.

Sakai Daiba ruins
The  are located in the Hanamachi neighbourhood of the city of Sakaiminato, Tottori, and were completed in 1864. It is a three-tiered trapezoidal earthwork with a height of about 6 meters and a width of about 25 meters. A total of eight guns were deployed, including two 18 -inch guns, one 6-inch gun, and five 5-inch guns manufactured at the Mutsuo reverberatory furnace. The site is now Sakaidaiba Park with a lighthouse and is about a 30-minute walk from Sakaiminato Station on the JR West Sakai Line.

Yodoe Daiba ruins
The  are located in the Yodoe neighborhood of the city of Yonago, facing Yodoe Port, and as completed in 1863. At present, the earthworks with a height of about 4 meters, a width of about 24 meters, and a length of about 67 meters remain. The site contained a 18-in gun, a 6-inch gun, and a 5-inch gun manufactured at the Mutsuo reverberatory furnace. The site is about a 15-minute walk from Yodoe Station on the JR San'in Main Line.

Hashizu Daiba ruins
The  are located in the Wainagase neighborhood of the town of Yurihama. The fortification had a symmetrical plan, but now only part of the earthwork on both wings, the rear earthwork, and the blind earthworks remain. The fortification was equipped with a 18-inch, 6-inch, 3-inch, and 5-inch cannons manufactured at the Mutsuo reverberatory furnace. The site can be reached by bus from Kurayoshi Station on the JR San'in Main Line.

Uradome Daiba ruins
The  is the only remaining fortification in the Inaba side of Tottori Domain, all of the previous fortifications being located in former Hōki Province. The Uradome Daiba was located in the town of Iwami. The fortifications measure about 100 meters from east-to-west, and the earthworks are about 10 meters wide and about 3 meters high. It was equipped with four cannons, including a 12-inch gun, a 6-inch gun, and a 5-inch gun. Currently, the site is maintained as Uradome Odaiba Park, and can be reached by bus from Iwami Station on the JR San'in Main Line.

Akasaki Daiba ruins
The  was built in 1853. It is the only semi-circular battery among the Tottori sites. At the time of its construction,Tottori Domain was low on funds, so it was largely built by donations from the local village headman with labor provided by surrounding villagers. Much of the site was destroyed by the construction of Japan National Route 9 in 1958; however, excavations in 2013 and 2014 found that the semi-circular portion of the fortification survived.
It was added to the National Historic Site designation in 2016.

See also
List of Historic Sites of Japan (Tottori)

References

External links
 Cultural Heritage of Tottori Prefecture 
Yonago City home page 

Bakumatsu
History of Tottori Prefecture
Sakaiminato, Tottori
Hokuei, Tottori
Yonago, Tottori
Yurihama, Tottori
Kotoura, Tottori
Iwami, Tottori
Inaba Province
Hōki Province
Coastal artillery
Historic Sites of Japan
19th-century fortifications in Japan